Louisiana's 2007 state elections were held on October 20, 2007, with runoff elections held on November 17. All statewide elected offices were up, as well as all seats in the Louisiana State Legislature.

Republicans were successful in electing the country's first Indian-American governor, Congressman Bobby Jindal. The issue of the state's response to Hurricane Katrina played a large part in the decision of incumbent governor Kathleen Blanco to retire rather than seek a second term in office. Term limits also effected many retirements in the state legislature, which proved to be a benefit to Republicans, who made gains in both houses.

Governor

Bobby Jindal avoided a runoff by getting a majority in the Jungle Primary with 54%, over a number of other contenders.

Lieutenant governor
Democratic incumbent Mitch Landrieu had the best showing of any Democrat running statewide, winning 56.6% of the vote. He was opposed by two Republicans, country musician Sammy Kershaw and State Representative Gary Beard, and by two Independents, Norris "Spanky" Gros Jr. and Thomas D. Kates.

Open Primary Results

Attorney general
Incumbent Attorney General Charles Foti was challenged by both a Democrat, James "Buddy" Caldwell, and a Republican, Royal Alexander. Foti placed third in the open primary, leading to a runoff between Caldwell and Alexander, in which Caldwell easily won.

Open Primary Results

Runoff Results

Commissioner of Agriculture and Forestry
Longtime incumbent Democrat Bob Odom faced his toughest re-election campaign ever, winning only 41% of the vote and ending up into a runoff with Republican State Representative Michael G. Strain. Odom withdrew from the runoff, making Strain the winner by default.

Open Primary Results

Commissioner of Insurance
Republican Jim Donelon, who was elected to the Insurance Commissioner post in a 2006 special election, defeated both Democrat Jim Crowley and Republicans Robert Lansden and Jerilyn Schneider-Kneale to win a full term.

Open Primary Results

Secretary of State
Republican incumbent Jay Dardenne, after winning a special election in 2006, easily defeated Democrat R. Wooley and Libertarian Scott A. Lewis III to win a full term.

Open Primary Results

State Treasurer
Incumbent John Neely Kennedy, a Democrat who switched to the Republican party in 2007, was re-elected unopposed.

State legislature

Louisiana Senate
In the open primary election, Democrats won a total of 22 seats, including both seats won outright and runoffs between two Democrats. Republicans won 12 seats outright with one runoff. In the runoff elections between a Democrat and a Republican, each party won two seats, making the post-election composition of the Senate 24 Democrats and 15 Republicans. Following the elections, Democratic State Sen. Robert Adley switched to the Republican party, making the Senate 23 Democrats and 16 Republicans .

House of Representatives
In the open primary, Democrats won a guaranteed 45 seats: 34 outright, with 11 runoffs between two Democrats. Republicans won a guaranteed 42 seats: 30 outright, with 12 runoffs between two Republicans. One independent was also elected. The remaining 17 seats went to runoffs, including 16 between a Democrat and a Republican and one between a Democrat and an Independent. Democrats and Republicans each won eight of these seats, with the last going to an Independent, giving the Democrats a slim 53 to 50, with two Independents, majority in the House of Representatives.

External links
Election Results

 
Louisiana